The 2019 French Grand Prix (formally known as the Formula 1 Pirelli Grand Prix de France 2019) was a Formula One motor race on 23 June 2019 at the Circuit Paul Ricard in Le Castellet, France. The race was the 8th round of the 2019 FIA Formula One World Championship.

The race was won by Mercedes driver Lewis Hamilton ahead of teammate Valtteri Bottas and Ferrari's Charles Leclerc.

Background

Entrants

The drivers and teams were the same as the season entry list with no additional stand-in drivers for the race. However, Nicholas Latifi drove in the first practice session for Williams.

Championship standings before the race
Before the race Lewis Hamilton had 162 points and held a 29-point lead over teammate Valtteri Bottas, with Sebastian Vettel third with 100 points, followed by Max Verstappen with 88 points, and then by Vettel's teammate Charles Leclerc in fifth place with 72 points.

In the Constructors' Championship standings, Mercedes led Ferrari with 295 points and had a 123-point lead having won all the previous races in the season so far. Red Bull was third with 124 points and McLaren was fourth with 30 points, just 2 points ahead of Renault with 28 points.

Penalties
Daniil Kvyat was required to start from the back of the grid as he exceeded his quota of power unit components, using a 4th Internal Combustion Unit (ICE), 3rd Motor Generator Unit-Kinetic (MGU-K), 3rd Energy Store (ES), 3rd Control Electronics (CE), 4th Turbocharger (TC) and 4th Motor Generator Unit-Heat (MGU-H). George Russell was required to start from the back of the grid as he exceeded his quota of power unit components, using a 3rd Energy Store (ES) and 3rd Control Electronics (CE).

Circuit changes
Following the 2018 race, teams and drivers expressed concerns about the pit lane entry which saw cars enter the lane aimed directly at the Mercedes garage. In response the FIA announced that the pit lane entry would be moved to somewhere between turns 14 and 15 and also announced that the track would be resurfaced.

The FIA also announced that they had moved to clamp down any potential corner cutting ahead of the French Grand Prix weekend at the Circuit Paul Ricard. The nature of the track, which had prominently been used as a test venue in preceding years, meant that there was a lot of runoff for the drivers if they made a mistake. However, there had been bollards and signs placed around the circuit in order to stop the drivers taking advantage of the runoff area, ensuring they would lose time and rejoin the circuit safely. At turn 2, two yellow bollards had appeared along with some red and white signage to indicate where a driver should rejoin the circuit. The event notes state: "Any driver who fails to negotiate Turn 2 by using the track, and who passes completely to the right of the first fluorescent yellow bollard on the apex of the corner, must keep completely to the right of the fluorescent yellow bollard and re-join the track by driving through the two arrays of blocks in the run-off by passing to the right of the first and to the left of the second." A similar system had been enforced further on in the first sector, at turns 3, 4, and 5.

The rules would not strictly apply to free practice sessions, and each case was supposed to be handled and analysed differently depending on the circumstance.

Free practice
Lewis Hamilton set the fastest time in FP1 followed by Valtteri Bottas. The Ferrari drivers were third and fourth, with Charles Leclerc ahead of Sebastian Vettel.

In FP2 it was another Mercedes 1–2 with Bottas leading Hamilton, and then Leclerc leading Vettel in 3–4. Early in the session Hamilton went off the track and joined unsafely, forcing Max Verstappen off the track when he rejoined. Hamilton was later summoned by the stewards but he received no penalty.

Qualifying

Qualifying classification 

Notes
  – Daniil Kvyat and George Russell were required to start from back of grid for exceeding their quotas of power unit components.

Race

Race summary 
The race began cleanly, with Carlos Sainz Jr. unsuccessfully attempting to overtake Max Verstappen and the two Mercedes cars maintaining their lead. On lap 6, George Russell attempted an overtake on teammate Robert Kubica around the outside of turn 10, but was pushed off-track, destroying a polystyrene distance marker. By the following lap, Sebastian Vettel had overtaken both McLarens to take fifth place.

Antonio Giovinazzi was the first driver to pit, on lap 8, after struggling with degrading soft-compound tyres. On lap 10, Sergio Pérez was handed a 5-second time penalty for leaving the track and gaining an advantage on lap 1. The decision was controversial, since Pérez had correctly passed around the penalty bollard after cutting turn 4 as specified by the race director, but had still overtaken Alexander Albon and Kevin Magnussen to claim 13th place as a result.

Verstappen was the first of the leading pack to pit, on lap 21. Charles Leclerc pitted on the following lap, as did Valtteri Bottas on lap 24, and Lewis Hamilton from the lead on lap 25. Vettel, who was yet to pit, had been far enough behind Hamilton that the Mercedes driver maintained the lead of the race. Vettel pitted on the following lap, emerging behind Verstappen and restoring the order of the top five. Lance Stroll was the final driver to make their first pit-stop; he did so on lap 40.

Romain Grosjean became the first and only retirement of the Grand Prix on lap 45 with an unspecified problem. A virtual safety car was briefly implemented on lap 50 after a bollard had rolled onto the track. Vettel pitted for soft-compound tyres on the penultimate lap in an attempt to claim the fastest lap point, which he did on the final lap of the race.

On the final lap, Lando Norris, who had been suffering from hydraulic problems, was passed by Daniel Ricciardo before turn 8. Ricciardo ran deep into the corner, and forced Norris off the track whilst rejoining it in turn 9. This allowed Kimi Räikkönen and Nico Hülkenberg through, with Räikkönen also getting past Ricciardo. Ricciardo then went off-track on the following straight to overtake the Alfa Romeo for seventh place. Ricciardo was later handed two 5-second penalties after the race, one for rejoining the track unsafely, and one for leaving the track and gaining an advantage. This demoted him to 11th place, outside of the points. The stewards also handed him two penalty points on his Super Licence for "Unsafe rejoining of track" and one point for "Gaining advantage off track".

Lewis Hamilton won the race from pole position ahead of teammate Valtteri Bottas and Charles Leclerc.

Race classification 

Notes
  – Includes one point for fastest lap.
  – Daniel Ricciardo finished 7th, but received two 5-second time penalties, the first for gaining an advantage by leaving the track limits and the second for failing to rejoin the track safely.

Championship standings after the race 

Drivers' Championship standings

Constructors' Championship standings

 Note: Only the top five positions are included for both sets of standings.

See also
 2019 Le Castellet Formula 2 round
 2019 Le Castellet Formula 3 round

References

External links

French Grand Prix
French
French Grand Prix
French Grand Prix